Iran participated in the eighth Winter Paralympics in Salt Lake City, United States.

Competitors

Results by event

Alpine skiing 

Men

External links
International Paralympic Committee

2002
Nations at the 2002 Winter Paralympics
Winter Paralympics